Alison Helen Holmes  is a British infectious diseases specialist, who is a professor at Imperial College London. Holmes serves as Director of the National Institute for Health Research (NIHR) Health Protection Research Unit in Healthcare Associated Infections and Antimicrobial Resistance and Consultant at Hammersmith Hospital. Holmes is on the Executive Committee of the International Society of Infectious Diseases, and she serves on a variety of World Health Organization (WHO) expert groups related to antimicrobial use, Antimicrobial Resistance (AMR), infection prevention and sepsis. Her research considers how to mitigate antimicrobial resistance''.

Early life and education 
Holmes went to school in Dar es Salaam, Tanzania. Her father was a doctor in Nigeria. Holmes completed her Bachelor of Medicine, Bachelor of Surgery degree in medicine at the University of Cambridge and St George’s Hospital Medical School. She specialised in Infectious Diseases and General (Internal) Medicine.

Research and career 
Antimicrobial resistance (AMR) represents a major threat to healthcare. There are increasing numbers of bacteria that can no longer be treated with antibiotics. At Imperial College London Holmes leads Centre for Antimicrobial Optimisation, a research centre that looks to tackle drug-resistant infection. She is Director of the National Institute for Health Research (NIHR) Health Protection Research Unit in Healthcare Associated Infections and AMR.

Selected publications 

 Birgand G, Castro-Sánchez E, Hansen S, et al., 2018, Comparison of governance approaches for the control of antimicrobial resistance: Analysis of three European countries, Antimicrobial Resistance and Infection Control, Vol:7,  Comparison of governance approaches for the control of antimicrobial resistance: analysis of three European countries
 Holmes AH, Holmes M, Gottlieb T, et al., 2018, End non-essential use of antimicrobials in livestock, Bmj, Vol:360,  End non-essential use of antimicrobials in livestock
 Ardal C, Outterson K, Hoffman SJ, et al., 2016, International cooperation to improve access to and sustain effectiveness of antimicrobials, The Lancet, Vol:387, Pages:296–307 International cooperation to improve access to and sustain effectiveness of antimicrobials
 Holmes AH, Moore LSP, Sundsfjord A, et al., 2015, Understanding the mechanisms and drivers of antimicrobial resistance, Lancet, Vol:387, Pages:176–187 Understanding the mechanisms and drivers of antimicrobial resistance
 Charani E, Holmes AH, 2013, Antimicrobial stewardship programmes: the need for wider engagement, BMJ Quality & Safety, Vol:22, Pages:885–887 Antimicrobial stewardship programmes: the need for wider engagement

Honours and awards
Holmes was elected a Fellow of the Academy of Medical Sciences (FMedSci) in 2017.

She was appointed Officer of the Order of the British Empire (OBE) in the 2021 Birthday Honours for services to medicine and infectious diseases, particularly during Covid-19.

References 

Living people
Year of birth missing (living people)
British microbiologists
NIHR Senior Investigators
Fellows of the Academy of Medical Sciences (United Kingdom)
British women biologists
Alumni of the University of Cambridge
Alumni of St George's, University of London
Harvard School of Public Health alumni
Officers of the Order of the British Empire